Namsskogan is a municipality in Trøndelag, Norway. Namsskogan is located in the upper part of the long Namdalen valley region. The administrative centre of the municipality is the village of Namsskogan. Other villages in the municipality include Brekkvasselv, Smalåsen, Skorovatn, and Trones.

The village of Namsskogan lies along the river Namsen in the northern part of the municipality. The European route E6 highway runs through the village.

The  municipality is the 64th largest by area out of the 356 municipalities in Norway. Namsskogan is the 344th most populous municipality in Norway with a population of 818.

General information

The municipality of Namsskogan was established on 1 July 1923 when it was separated from the large municipality of Grong. Initially, the population of Namsskogan was 469. The municipal boundaries have not changed since.  On 1 January 2018, the municipality switched from the old Nord-Trøndelag county to the new Trøndelag county.

Name
The municipality is named Namsskogan, a name which was created in 1923. Therefore, the meaning of the name is "the woodlands around Namsen". The river name has an uncertain origin. The first part of the river name comes from the Old Norse word ) which has an unknown meaning, but it may come from the word  which means "boat". The second part of the river name  which means "sea".

Coat of arms
The coat of arms was granted on 21 December 1984. The official blazon is "Sable, moose antlers Or". This means the arms have a black field (background) and the charge is a set of moose antlers. The antlers have a tincture of Or which means the design is commonly colored yellow, but if it is made out of metal, then gold is used. The design was chosen to symbolize the heavily forested municipality where one can find many moose. The arms are based on a very large antler, with a rare golden color, which hangs on the municipal hall. The arms were designed by Nora Stommyrbakken and Einar H. Skjervold. The municipal flag has the same design as the coat of arms.

Churches
The Church of Norway has one parish within the municipality of Namsskogan. It is part of the Namdal prosti (deanery) in the Diocese of Nidaros.

Geography

Namsskogan is located in the northeast part of Trøndelag county. It is a heavily forested area with several large lakes including Kalvvatnet, Mellingsvatnet, Storfrøyningen, Storgåsvatnet, and Tunnsjøflyan. The river Namsen runs south through the Namdalen valley. The extreme northeastern part of the municipality is part of Børgefjell National Park.

Climate
Namsskogan, located inland in the upper part of Namdalen valley, has a boreal climate, but with more winter precipitation than in most other boreal climates, so there is often a lot of snow on the ground in winter. The all-time high  is from July 2019. Warmest month on record was July 2014 with monthly mean , average daily high  and 8 days with high at or above . The all-time low  was recorded January 2010. The coldest month in recent decades was December 2010 with monthly mean  and average daily high . The weather station started recording in 1895; there might be colder lows recorded before 2006.

Government
All municipalities in Norway, including Namskogan, are responsible for primary education (through 10th grade), outpatient health services, senior citizen services, unemployment and other social services, zoning, economic development, and municipal roads. The municipality is governed by a municipal council of elected representatives, which in turn elect a mayor.  The municipality falls under the Trøndelag District Court and the Frostating Court of Appeal.

Municipal council
The municipal council of Namskogan is made up of 13 representatives that are elected to four year terms. The party breakdown of the council is as follows:

Politics
In the 2007 municipal elections, Namsskogan had the highest vote for the Socialist Left party in Norway, at 33.6 per cent.

Mayors
The mayors of Namsskogan:

1923–1928: Kristian Trones (LL)
1929–1934: Arne Østgaard (V)
1935–1938: Ole Lindsetmo (V)
1939–1942: Alf Viken (Ap)
1942–1945: Ole Myrvold (NS)
1945–1947: Alf Viken (Ap)
1948–1951: Karl Myrvold (Ap)
1952–1955: Agnar Lindsetmo (V)
1956–1965: Reidar C. Hansen (Ap)
1965–1971: Alv Westin (Ap)
1972–1981: Hans Dahle (Ap)
1982–1983: Arnodd Grøttum (LL)
1984–1991: Sturla Sørgaard (Ap)
1992–1995: Inge Ryan (SV)
1995–1999: Kåre Vik (Sp)
1999–2003: Arnt Torseth (Ap)
2003–2007: Knut Berger (Ap)
2007–2011: Kari Ystgård (SV)
2011–present: Stian Brekkvassmo (Ap)

Notable people 
Lene Cecilia Sparrok (born 1997) a Norwegian Southern Sámi actress

References

External links

Municipal fact sheet from Statistics Norway 

 
Municipalities of Trøndelag
1923 establishments in Norway